Kauê Rodrigues Pessanha (born 22 October 2004) is a Brazilian footballer who plays as a midfielder for Botafogo.

Club career
Kauê joined the academy of Botafogo in 2017, rising through the club's youth teams and playing under-20 football while still only 16. He signed his first professional contract in April 2022, before training with the first team in September of the same year.

Having impressed in first team training, he was reported to have been integrated permanently ahead of the 2023 season.

International career
Valim was first called up to the Brazil under-20 team in May 2022.

References

External links
 

2004 births
Living people
Brazilian footballers
Brazil youth international footballers
Association football midfielders
Botafogo de Futebol e Regatas players